Adhesive is a Swedish punk rock band that was active between 1994-2002 and reunited in 2017. Though Adhesive played the majority of their concerts in the band's native Sweden, they also toured throughout Europe and North America. All of the Adhesive back catalog is out of print.

Former band members currently perform in such groups as We Live In Trenches, The Typewriter Romantics, Haveri, The Indecision Alarm, The New Mess, Straitjacket Generation and Dia Psalma.

In 2017, the band reunited to play live shows and is donating all the money they receive from their concerts to charity.

Band members: original line-up 
 Robert Samsonowitz - Drums
 Micke Claesson (later changed last name to Fritz) - Vocals and guitar
 Geir Pedersen - Vocals and bass
 Mathias Andersson - Guitar and vocals (Mathias later left the band and Pontus Bednarz replaced him)

Discography

Albums
Sideburner (Ampersand, 1996)
From Left to Right (Ampersand, 1998)
We Got the Beat (Ampersand, 2000)

EPs
Yoghurt (Brööl Records, 1995)
On a Pedestal (Ampersand, 1996)
Prefab Life (Ampersand, 1998)

Splits
No Better, No Worse (split with Pridebowl, Bad Taste Records,1998)

Demos
Thrust & Burn (Self Released, 1994)

External links
Review of Sideburner

Swedish punk rock groups